The Fernmeldeturm Kiel (Telecommunication Tower Kiel) is a modern landmark of Kiel in Germany, completed in 1975. The 230-metre-high tower, which is used for directional services and TV, VHF and UHF transmission is not accessible to the public. The basket of this tower, which belongs to German Telekom Inc., has a diameter of 40 metres.

See also
 List of towers

External links
 
 https://web.archive.org/web/20051118093630/http://www.kielmonitor.de/filme/fernsehturm.html

Towers completed in 1975
Radio masts and towers in Germany
Buildings and structures in Kiel
1975 establishments in West Germany